The square-mouthed vases culture (Italian: cultura dei vasi a bocca quadrata) is a culture of the Middle Neolithic period, widespread in northern Italy during the fifth millennium BC. The name comes from the characteristic type of vessel, which has a square mouthpiece instead of circular.

Three time periods
The culture is divided into three different time periods, depending on the style of the pottery decoration: the oldest is known as the Finale-Quinziano and shows a decoration of small incisions and graffiti; the middle period or Rivoli-Chiozza is characterized by meander and spiral decorations; while the most recent phase, the Rivoli-Castelnuovo, is typified by vessels with figures engraved and imprinted.

Geographic spread

This culture shares a lot of features, including square-mouthed vases, with the Danubian cultures of the middle Danube valleys.  The culture of the square-mouthed vases spread widely in northern Italy, penetrating deeply among local populations, replacing the previous cultures, in a process which may not always have been peaceful. The typical elements of this culture (grave goods with polished axes, use of bow and arrow, cylindrical frames) are often found to suddenly supplant the pre-existing cultural groups. Sometimes elements have been assimilated as decorative features, e.g. in the Veneto and Trentino area. These cultural upheavals, occurring around 4000 BC, led to a strong unification of the territories, with a homogeneity of style in subsequent archaeological findings.

The people of this culture were very active in agriculture and trades. Behind the development of the culture, it seems that there was a vast wealth of flocks and herds, which gave mobility, resources, and ability to adapt. The society engaged in both arabal and pastoral forms of agriculture. A warrior component was behind the spread of the culture and its peoples. The leader of social groups was a farmer-shepherd-warrior; a family head who ran all the group's activities.

References

External links 
 

Archaeological cultures of Southern Europe
Neolithic cultures of Europe
Archaeological cultures in Italy